Sharon Fichman and Julia Görges were the defending champions, but both chose not to participate.

Alexandra Panova and Urszula Radwańska won the tournament defeating Erika Sema and Roxane Vaisemberg in the final 6–2, 6–1.

Seeds

Draw

Draw

References
 Doubles Draw

Open GDF Suez de Biarritz - Doubles